Roy Hughes (born 1954) is a Canadian contract bridge writer and expert player. He won the International Bridge Press Association (IBPA) Book of the Year award in 2007 for Canada's Bridge Warriors, about the Canadian pair Eric Murray and Sami Kehela. That was his third bridge book, and the first two had been finalists for the IBPA award, Building a Bidding System and Card By Card. His fourth book, The Contested Auction, won the 2012 award (now sponsored by his publisher Master Point Press).

Hughes lives in Toronto, Canada.

Books

 Building a Bidding System (Toronto: Master Point Press, 2005), 148 pp. 
 Card by Card: Adventures at the Bridge Table (Master Point, 2006), 240 pp. 
 Canada's Bridge Warriors: Eric Murray and Sami Kehela (Master Point, 2007), 336 pp. 
 The Contested Auction at Bridge (Master Point, 2012), 336 pp. 
 Further Adventures at the Bridge Table (Master Point, 2013)

References

External links
 Roy Hughes Blog at BridgeBlogging
 Interview at TeachBridge – publisher Master Point Press (2012?)
 
 

1954 births
Living people
Contract bridge writers
Canadian contract bridge players
Place of birth missing (living people)
Date of birth missing (living people)
Writers from Toronto